The oceanic zone is typically defined as the area of the ocean lying beyond the continental shelf (such as the Neritic zone), but operationally is often referred to as beginning where the water depths drop to below 200 meters (660 feet), seaward from the coast into the open ocean with its Pelagic zone.

It is the region of open sea beyond the edge of the continental shelf and includes 65% of the ocean’s completely open water. The oceanic zone has a wide array of undersea terrain, including trenches that are often deeper than Mount Everest is tall, as well as deep-sea volcanoes and ocean basins. While it is often difficult for life to sustain itself in this type of environment, many species have adapted and do thrive in the oceanic zone.

There are four ocean zones: the Sunlight zone, the Twilight zone, the Midnight zone, and the Abyssal zone.

Sub zones

The Mesopelagic (disphotic) zone, which is where only small amounts of light penetrate, lies below the Epipelagic zone. This zone is often referred to as the "Twilight Zone" due to its scarce amount of light.

54% of the ocean lies in the Bathypelagic (aphotic) zone into which no light penetrates. This is also called the midnight zone and the deep ocean. Due to the complete lack of sunlight, photosynthesis cannot occur and the only light source is bioluminescence. Water pressure is very intense and the temperatures are near freezing (range ).

Marine life

Oceanographers have divided the ocean into zones based on how far light reaches. All of the light zones can be found in the oceanic zone. The epipelagic zone is the one closest to the surface and is the best lit. It extends to 100 meters and contains both phytoplankton and zooplankton that can support larger organisms like marine mammals and some types of fish. Past 100 meters, not enough light penetrates the water to support life, and no plant life exists.

There are creatures, however, which thrive around hydrothermal vents, or geysers located on the ocean floor that expel superheated water that is rich in minerals. These organisms feed off of chemosynthetic bacteria, which use the superheated water and chemicals from the hydrothermal vents to create energy in place of photosynthesis.  The existence of these bacteria allow creatures like squids, hatchet fish, octopuses, tube worms, giant clams, spider crabs and other organisms to survive.

Due to the total darkness in the zones past the epipelagic zone, many organisms that survive in the deep oceans do not have eyes, and other organisms make their own light with bioluminescence. Often the light is blue-green in color, because many marine organisms are sensitive to blue light. Two chemicals, luciferin, and luciferase that react with one another to create a soft glow. The process by which bioluminescence is created is very similar to what happens when a glow stick is broken. Deep-sea organisms use bioluminescence for everything from luring prey to navigation.

Animals such as fish, whales, and sharks are found in the oceanic zone.

References

 Physical oceanography
 Oceanographical terminology